Jane Scarpantoni (born 1960) is a classically trained American cello player who has played on a number of alternative rock albums.

She was a member of Hoboken, New Jersey's Tiny Lights in the mid-1980s, then went on to play with other musicians especially those associated with the Hoboken underground rock scene of the 1980s and early 1990s, including Silverchair, Bruce Springsteen, Sheryl Crow, Patti Smith, Richard Barone, R.E.M., Indigo Girls, 10,000 Maniacs, Throwing Muses, Kristin Hersh, Lou Reed, Chris Cacavas, Bob Mould, John Lurie's Lounge Lizards, Boo Trundle, Train and many others.

Discography 
 10,000 Maniacs – MTV Unplugged
 Richard Barone – Cool Blue Halo
 Richard Barone – Primal Dream
 Richard Barone – Clouds Over Eden
 Richard Barone – Between Heaven and Cello
 Richard Barone – Cool Blue Halo 25th Anniversary Concert 
 Beastie Boys – Hello Nasty
 Blonde Redhead – Misery Is a Butterfly
 Crash Test Dummies – I Don't Care That You Don't Mind
 Crash Test Dummies – Jingle All the Way
 Crash Test Dummies – Songs of the Unforgiven
 Sheryl Crow – Sheryl Crow
 Sheryl Crow – C'mon, C'mon
 Delerium – Chimera
 Die Monster Die – Withdrawal Method
 Mike Doughty – Haughty Melodic
 Ben Folds Five – The Unauthorized Biography of Reinhold Messner
 Fuel – Sunburn
 The Grapes of Wrath – Now and Again
 Adam Green – Friends of Mine
 John S. Hall – The Body Has a Head
 Helmet – Aftertaste
 Peter Holsapple & Chris Stamey-Mavericks
 Kristin Hersh – Hips and Makers
 Ida – Lovers Prayers
 Indigo Girls – Swamp Ophelia
 Indigo Girls – 1200 Curfews
 Freedy Johnston – This Perfect World
 Freedy Johnston – Never Home
 King Missile III – Failure
 King Missile – Royal Lunch
 Ben Kweller – Sha Sha
 Ray LaMontagne – Till the Sun Turns Black
 Mauro – Songs from a Bad Hat
 Sarah McLachlan – Fumbling Towards Ecstasy
 Sarah McLachlan – Rarities, B-Sides and Other Stuff
 Bob Mould – Workbook
 R.E.M. – Green
 The Veils – Nux Vomica
 Lou Reed – Ecstasy (2000)
 Lou Reed – The Raven (2003)
 Lou Reed - Animal Serenade (2004)
 Lou Reed – Spanish Fly – Live in Spain (2005)
 Lou Reed – Sweet Jane – Live in Los Angeles, 2003
 Lou Reed - Berlin: Live at St. Ann's Warehouse (2007)
 Luthea Salom – Out Of Without
 Soul Asylum– Let Your Dim Light Shine 
 Silverchair – Freak Show
 Silverchair – Neon Ballroom
 Bruce Springsteen – The Rising
 Throwing Muses – University
 Ween – White Pepper
 Suzanne Vega – Nine Objects of Desire
 Swans – The Seer
 The Wayfarers - World's Fare (Endless Days) (Tana)
 Samuel Claiborne – 'Hurt' (from the album Love, Lust, and Genocide) (2015)

References

External links

A conversation with Jane Scarpantoni

1960 births
American rock cellists
Musicians from New York City
Indigo Girls members
American alternative rock musicians
Living people
King Missile members
Tiny Lights members
American people of Italian descent
Women cellists
The Lounge Lizards members